The Men's 100 metre backstroke event at the 2015 African Games took place on 10 September 2015 at Kintele Aquatic Complex.

Schedule
All times are Congo Standard Time (UTC+01:00)

Records

Results

Heats 
The heats were held on 10 September.

Final 
The final were held on 10 September.

References

External links
Official website

Swimming at the 2015 African Games